Craige Schensted, who formally changed his name to Ea Ea, was an American physicist and mathematician who first formulated the insertion algorithm  that defines the Robinson–Schensted correspondence. Under a different form, that correspondence had earlier been described by Gilbert de Beauregard Robinson in 1938, but it is due to the Schensted insertion algorithm that the correspondence has become widely known in combinatorics. Schensted also designed several board games including *Star,  Star, and Y. In  1995, he changed his name to  Ea, the Babylonian name for the Sumerian god Enki, and in 1999 changed it to Ea Ea. He lived on Peaks Island in Portland, Maine.

References

External links
Home page of Ea Ea, formerly Craige Schensted
Biography of Ea Ea
Obituary of Ea Ea

Board game designers
Year of birth missing (living people)
20th-century American mathematicians
21st-century American mathematicians
People from Portland, Maine
Living people